The Roman Catholic Church in the lesser East African Indian Ocean states (not Madagascar) is composed of only a Latin hierarchy, without a proper ecclesiastical province but joined in a single episcopal conference, comprising five exempt jurisdictions, i.e. directly dependent on the Holy See : 
 three exempt dioceses (on Mauritius, Réunion and the Seychelles) 
 two missionary pre-diocesan Apostolic vicariates (entitled to titular bishops) : one for the Comoros and Mayotte; the other in above Mauritius.

There are no titular sees.
 
All defunct jurisdictions have current successors.

There are also three papal diplomatic representations (in fact all vested in the apostolic nunciature (embassy) on Madagascar) : 
 an apostolic nunciature to Mauritius
 an apostolic nunciature to the Seychelles
 an apostolic delegation (papal legation) to the Comoros; none to Mayotte or Réunion, as those depend on metropolitan France without full statehood.

Current jurisdictions

Episcopal Conference of the Indian Ocean (minor African East Coast Island states) 

all Immediately subject to the Holy See

 Mauritius
 Diocese of Port-Louis on Mauritius (also covers the British Indian Ocean Territory)
 Apostolic Vicariate of Rodrigues, covering part of Mauritius
 Diocese of Saint-Denis-de-La Réunion on and for Réunion
 Diocese of Port Victoria on and for the Seychelles
 Apostolic Vicariate of Archipel des Comores, on the Comoros, also for Mayotte.

Sources and external links 
 GCatholic.org Comoros.
 GCatholic.org Mauritius.
 GCatholic.org Mayotte.
 GCatholic.org Réunion.
 GCatholic.org Seychelles.
 Catholic-Hierarchy entry.

Indian Ocean